Belvedere is a new neighborhood approved by Calgary City Council on April 8, 2013.°

See also
List of neighbourhoods in Calgary

References

https://web.archive.org/web/20141205045428/http://www.calgary.ca/PDA/pd/Pages/Current-studies-and-ongoing-activities/Belvedere-Area-Structure-Plan.aspx

Neighbourhoods in Calgary